The Softones are an American male singing group from the city of Baltimore, Maryland, best known for their 'sweet' soul recordings of the 1970s.

History
They recorded for the New York-based Avco Records label (later renamed H&L Records) from the early 1970s, releasing three albums and about a dozen singles.  The most popular tracks were "My Dream", "Can't Help Falling In Love", "I'm Gonna Prove It", and "That Old Black Magic" (#29 Billboard R&B, #2 Disco; 1976). Their first single, "Any Street", was picked up from tiny Baltimore label Thereway, along with a few other early recordings including "My Dream".  They were initially known as "The Soft Tones" until the release of their first album in late 1973.  

Like later recordings for Avco by The Stylistics, The Softones were produced by label owners, Hugo Peretti, Luigi Creatore, and arranger/producer Van McCoy, whose orchestra, comprising some of the top New York session players of the time, served as the house band for many of their Avco records. 

Since then, the group has released several further recordings, including a joint album in 1979 on Park-Way International with another Baltimore group, First Class, called Together, which included the popular "Carla My Love".

Although not as successful as some of their peers, such as The Stylistics and The Moments, most of their recorded output has gained in reputation among collectors over the years.

The group is notable for lead singer J. Marvin Brown's high falsetto, similar to that of The Stylistics' lead singer Russell Thompkins Jr. and Earth, Wind & Fire's Philip Bailey, and derived from Eddie Kendricks' falsetto style with The Temptations.  Also in the group are Steven Jackson, Elton Lynch and Byron Summerville.

Byron Summerville died in 2012 at the age of 60. J. Marvin Brown died in July 2020 at the age of 66.

References

External links
 

American soul musical groups
Avco Records artists